Spertiniite is a rare copper hydroxide mineral. Chemically it is copper(II) hydroxide with formula Cu(OH)2. It occurs as blue to blue green tabular orthorhombic crystal aggregates in a secondary alkaline environment altering chalcocite. Associated minerals include chalcocite, atacamite, native copper, diopside, grossular and vesuvianite.

Discovery and occurrence
It was first described in 1981 for an occurrence in the Jeffrey quarry of the Johns-Manville mine, Asbestos, Estrie, Québec. It was named for mine geologist Francesco Spertini (born 1937). In addition to the type locality, it has also been reported from Mont Saint-Hilaire, Quebec; Ely, White Pine County, Nevada; and Bisbee, Cochise County, Arizona. It has been reported from Dzhezkazgan, Kazakhstan; from slag at Juliushutte, Astfeld, Harz Mountains, Germany; and from Tsumeb, Namibia.

A 2006 study has produced evidence the blue mineral chrysocolla may be a microscopic mixture of spertiniite, amorphous silica and water.

References

Copper(II) minerals
Hydroxide minerals
Orthorhombic minerals
Minerals in space group 36